The Sino-Soviet War may refer to:

 Sino-Soviet conflict (1929), minor armed conflict over a railway in 1929
 Sino-Soviet border conflict, military conflict in 1969